This is a list of notable social software: selected examples of social software products and services that facilitate a variety of forms of social human contact.

Blogs

Apache Roller
Blogger
IBM Lotus Connections
Posterous
Telligent Community
Tumblr
Typepad
WordPress
Xanga

Clipping
Diigo
Evernote

Instant messaging
Comparison of instant messaging clients
Comparison of XMPP server software
IBM Lotus Sametime
Live Communications Server 2003
Live Communications Server 2005
Microsoft Lync Server

Internet forums

 Comparison of Internet forum software

Internet Relay Chat (IRC)
Internet Relay Chat

eLearning

Massively multiplayer online games

Media sharing
blip.tv
Dailymotion
Flickr
Ipernity
Metacafe
Putfile
SmugMug
Tangle
Vimeo
YouTube
Zooomr
IBM Lotus Connections

Media cataloging

Online dating

Web directories

Social bookmarking

Web widgets
 AddThis
AddToAny
 ShareThis
 Social bookmark link generator

Websites

Enterprise software
 Altova MetaTeam
 IBM Lotus Connections
 Jumper 2.0 Enterprise

Social cataloging

 aNobii
 Goodreads
 Knowledge Plaza
 Librarything
 Readgeek
 Shelfari
 KartMe

Social citations

 BibSonomy
 CiteULike
 Connotea
 Jumper 2.0 Enterprise
 Knowledge Plaza
 Mendeley
 refbase
 Zotero

Social evolutionary computation

 Knowledge iN
 Quora
 Yahoo! Answers

Social login

 Loginradius

Social networks

Social search

 Jumper 2.0
 Knowledge Plaza

Social customer support software

Virtual worlds 
 Active Worlds
 Google Lively (now defunct)
 Kaneva
 Second Life
 There
 Meez

Wikis

References

Social software

Social software